Lee Si-hyeong (Hangul: 이시형; born December 15, 2000) is a South Korean figure skater. He has competed in the final segment at eight ISU Championships (five Four Continents and three World Junior Championships), achieving his highest placement, seventh, at the 2022 Four Continents. He also represented his country at the 2022 Winter Olympics. He is a five-time South Korean national medalist (bronze in 2017, 2019, silver in 2020, 2021, 2022).

Programs

Competitive highlights
CS: Challenger Series; JGP: Junior Grand Prix

Detailed results

Senior level

Junior level

References

External links 
 

2000 births
Living people
South Korean male single skaters
People from Namyangju
Figure skaters at the 2022 Winter Olympics
Olympic figure skaters of South Korea
Competitors at the 2023 Winter World University Games
Sportspeople from Gyeonggi Province